WRPC-LP is a Contemporary Christian formatted broadcast radio station licensed to Hampton, Virginia, serving the Hampton/Newport News area.  WRPC-LP is owned and operated by Peninsula Family Radio.

References

External links
 XL103 Online
 

Contemporary Christian radio stations in the United States
R
Radio stations established in 2007
RPC-LP